The qualifying competition for the 1968 CONCACAF Pre-Olympic Tournament determined the four teams of the final tournament.

First round

|}

Second round

|}

External links
Concacaf Men's Olympic Qualifying, CONCACAF.com

References

CONCACAF Men's Olympic Qualifying Tournament
Oly
Football qualification for the 1968 Summer Olympics